Richey is a surname and a given name, and may refer to:

Surname:
 Alexander George Richey (1830–1883), Irish barrister and historian
 Charles Robert Richey (1923–1997), United States federal judge
 Cliff Richey (born 1946), American tennis player
 David Michael Richey (1938–2015), real name of the American jazz musician Slim Richey
 George Richey (1935–2010), American songwriter and record producer
 Helen Richey (1909–1947), American aviator
 Helen Richey (dancer) (born 1946), ballroom and Latin dancer and judge
 Isabel Grimes Richey (1858–1910), American writer, poet
 James Alexander Richey (1874–1931), British imperial administrator, son of the following
 James Bellett Richey (1834-1902), British colonial administrator
 Joe Richey (1931–1995), American basketball player
 Joseph Richey (1843-1877), Anglo-Irish episcopal minister
 Kelly Richey (born 1962), American blues musician
 Kenny Richey (born 1964), British-US dual citizen once on death row
 Kim Richey (born 1956), American singer-songwriter 
 Matthew Richey (1803–1883), Irish-Canadian Methodist
 Matthew Henry Richey (1828–1911), Canadian politician 
 Mary Anne Richey (1917–1983), United States federal judge
 Michael Richey (sailor) (1917–2009), English sailor, winner of the John Llewellyn Rhys Prize 1942
 Michael Richey (scholar) (1678–1761), German scholar and poet, set the verses to Telemanns Admiralitätsmusik 
 Nancy Richey (born 1942), American tennis player
 Ronald K. Richey (1926–2010), CEO of Torchmark Corporation 
 Wade Richey, American football player

Given name:
 Richey Edwards (born 1967, disappeared 1995, presumed dead 2008), Welsh musician, lyricist and rhythm guitarist of the alternative rock band Manic Street Preachers
 Richey V. Graham (1886-1972), American politician
 Richey Reneberg (born 1965), American tennis player

See also
 , a World War II US Navy destroyer escort
 Richey, Montana, a town, United States

Masculine given names